Akiko Honda is a Japanese politician who is a member of the House of Councillors of Japan. She was elected in 2019 to the national proportional representation block.

Biography 
She was born on 29 September 1971 in Kumamoto Prefecture and graduated from Hoshi University in 1996.

References 

Living people
Members of the House of Councillors (Japan)
Female members of the House of Councillors (Japan)
1971 births
People from Kumamoto Prefecture
HoshiUniversity alumni